Cuvillier is a surname of French origin.

Persons
Notable people with the surname include:

 Alexandre Cuvillier (born 1986), French footballer.
 Alfred-Auguste Cuvillier-Fleury (1802–1887), French historian and literary critic.
 Armand Cuvillier (1887-1973), French intellectual.
 Austin Cuvillier (1779–1849), Canadian businessman and politician.
 Charles Cuvillier (1877–1955), French operetta composer.
 Christophe Cuvillier (born 1962), French businessman, CEO of Unibail-Rodamco.
 Elian Cuvillier (born 1960), exegete and theologian Protestant French.
 Frédéric Cuvillier (born 1968), French politician.
 Jacques Philippe Cuvillier (1774-1857), admiral and French colonial governor.
 Louis A. Cuvillier (1871–1935), New York politician.
 Maurice Cuvillier (1897-1956), French comic book author.
 Philippe Cuvillier (1930-2015), French diplomat, ambassador of France.
 Roger Cuvillier (born 1922), French engineer.

Toponyms
Cuvillier River, a river in Québec, Canada

French-language surnames
Surnames of French origin